Cavan and Leitrim Railway 1 to 8 were  locomotives built by Robert Stephenson and Company, and were the first locomotives on the C&LR. On the 1925 amalgamation, when the railway became part of the Great Southern Railways, they were designated Class 1L or Class DN2.

The branch line from Ballinamore to Arigna followed in May 1888 and in 1920 extended to the coal mines beyond the village. The line was closed in May 1959, leaving only the West Clare Railway as the sole surviving narrow gauge line in Ireland. On opening the line had a fleet of 8 steam locomotives, numbered 1 to 8.

History 
At its opening the C&LR had a stock of 8 steam locomotives, all of the same wheel arrangement and built by Robert Stephenson and Company
 
Locomotive Nos. 5 to 8 were supplied by the makers complete with skirting over wheels, cowcatcher, bell, and headlamp at the bunker end, typical of a "tramway - type" locomotive for use on open (unfenced) track. These locomotives were fitted with condensing gear and each cab was fitted with duplicate driving controls.

On delivery the locomotives were unnamed and it was suggested that they be named after the Directors' daughters. Locomotive No.1 was named "Isabel" after the daughter of R.H. Johnstone of Bawnboy House, the longest serving director of the C&LR.

No.8 "Queen Victoria" lost her nameplates under, what were described as, 'patriotic' circumstances in 1923. The plates were eventually found and the C&L insisted they should be  restoring to the locomotive, however within a few days they again disappeared, this time never to be found.

At the 1925 amalgamation the C&LR became part of the Great Southern Railways and the above 8 locomotives, the rolling stock and infrastructure passed to the new company (along with an  locomotive, No. 9 of 1904).

All were rebuilt with larger boilers in 1902–1906.

(a) Rebuilt from 1930 with brick arch in firebox to burn hard Welsh coal instead of the soft product from Arigna's mines.

Livery 
Locomotives were painted green with red and white lining. Cast brass plates were attached, numbers to cabsides, nameplates to side tanks. Following takeover by the GSR in 1925, all locos were gradually painted the GSR standard plain unlined grey, with numerals painted in pale yellow on the tank sides. However, this did not happen overnight; two retained the original livery as late as 1932.

Preservation 
Two examples are preserved; No.2 "Kathleen" was reserved for preservation and can be seen today in the Ulster Folk and Transport Museum together with an original C&LR coach.
No.3 "Lady Edith" was sold in April 1959 to New York businessman and rail enthusiast Edgar Mead and shipped over to the United States. It first went on display at Pleasure Island (Massachusetts amusement park) alongside locomotives that later formed part of Steamtown, U.S.A. In 1962 the engine was relocated to the 3 ft-gauge Pine Creek Railroad, now part of New Jersey Museum of Transportation and restored to operating condition by 1967 in Allaire State Park, where it remains to this day as of 2023. It has not operated since the mid-1990s due to changes in federal standards for steam locomotives in the US.

References

External links
Irish narrow gauge locomotives by railway
Lady Edith at the New Jersey Museum of Transportation

3 ft gauge locomotives
4-4-0T locomotives
Robert Stephenson and Company locomotives
Steam locomotives of Ireland
Railway locomotives introduced in 1887
Scrapped locomotives